Burg is a municipality in the district of Dithmarschen, in Schleswig-Holstein, Germany.
It lies at the rim of the Heide-Itzehoe Geest with parts of the village in the marshland below. It was named after a fortress "Bökelnburg" of which a 9th-century earth wall ring remains.  According to legend Burg was the site of a farmer's revolt.  They burned down the castle and killed the count who had asked for a "tenth" tribute despite it being a time of drought.

References

Dithmarschen